Roslyn Estates is a village in the Town of North Hempstead in Nassau County, on the North Shore of Long Island, in New York, United States. It is considered part of the Greater Roslyn area, which is anchored by the Incorporated Village of Roslyn. The population was 1,318 at the 2020 census.

History 
Roslyn Estates was first developed in the early 20th Century (circa 1908) by Dean Alvord, who also developed Prospect Park South in Brooklyn and Belle Terre in Port Jefferson. It was nicknamed "The Eden of Long Island" when originally developed, due to the community's design and setting.

In 1931, residents decided to try incorporating Roslyn Estates as a village, due to the fact that the original deed restrictions were set to expire around that time. Their efforts to incorporate were successful, and the Village of Roslyn Estates was incorporated on June 8, 1931.

In 1972, Roslyn Estates Village Hall was built. It was designed by John A. Grammas on land given to the village by the firm of Saul Sokolov, Inc., which had developed that section of Roslyn Estates.

In 1974, Mayor Robert D. Zucker attempted to have the boundaries of the Manhasset Park District redrawn to include the village after the district added an additional 260 parking spaces to the commuter parking fields at the Manhasset Long Island Rail Road station. Zucker stated that many Roslyn Estates residents preferred the Manhasset station over the closer Roslyn station due to the fact that service to/from Pennsylvania Station on the Port Washington Branch is direct, whereas a change at Jamaica is required on the Oyster Bay Branch. By having the district boundaries redrawn to include the village, Roslyn Estates residents would have the ability to be guaranteed a parking space at the Manhasset station for commuting to/from Manhattan. Officials from both North Hempstead and the Manhasset Park District, as well as Manhasset residents lamented the idea, given that Roslyn Estates is not part of the Greater Manhasset area, and felt that the needs of Greater Manhasset should be paramount for the Manhasset Park District. The proposal was ultimately denied.

Roslyn Estates celebrated its 50th Anniversary in 1981.

The name of Roslyn Estates was taken directly from the name which was used by the community's original development group, Roslyn Estates, Incorporated. The "Roslyn" part of its name is shared with Roslyn, Roslyn Harbor, and Roslyn Heights, and ultimately can be traced back to when the name "Roslyn" was chosen for that village, which was chosen because the geography in Roslyn reminded officials of the geography of Roslin, Scotland.

Geography

Topography 
Like the rest of Long Island's North Shore, Roslyn Estates is situated on a terminal moraine known as the Harbor Hill Moraine. This moraine was formed by glaciers during the Wisconsin Glacial Episode, The moraine is named for Harbor Hill – the highest geographic point in Nassau County, which is located in nearby East Hills.

Drainage 

Roslyn Estates is split among four minor drainage areas: Inner Hempstead Harbor (part of the Hempstead Harbor Watershed), Hempstead Lake, Mill River (both part of the Mill River Watershed), and Leeds Pond (part of the Manhasset Bay Watershed), and is located within the larger Long Island Sound/Atlantic Ocean Watershed.

Climate 
The Village of Roslyn Estates features a humid subtropical climate (Cfa) under the Köppen climate classification,. As such, the village experiences hot, humid summers and cold winters, and experiences precipitation throughout the entirety of the year.

Economy 
Roslyn Estates is a bedroom community of the City of New York, which is how the community was originally developed to be by Dean Alvord. As such, a significant number of Roslyn Estates residents commute to/from New York for work.

The village itself is predominantly residential in character, with the heavy majority of lots within the village being zoned for single-family homes. The village has a business district along the south side of Northern Boulevard, which is where the heavy majority of businesses within the village are located. The exceptions are the former Roslyn Estates Sales Office and former Highland Elementary School towards the southeastern edge of the village; these buildings are now a restaurant and house of worship, respectively.

Demographics

2020 census 
As of the census of 2020, there were 1,318 people residing in the village. The racial makeup of the village was 80.57% White, 0.91% African American, 0.01% Native American, 12.82% Asian, 0.98% from other races, and 4.09% from two or more races. Hispanic or Latino of any race were 3.18% of the population.

2010 census 
As of the census of 2010, there were 1,251 people residing in the village. The racial makeup of the village was 90.25% White, 0.40% African American, 8.23% Asian, 0.24% from other races, and 0.88% from two or more races. Hispanic or Latino of any race were 1.36% of the population.

Census 2000 
As of the census of 2000, there were 1,210 people, 401 households, and 354 families residing in the village. The population density was 2,727.7 people per square mile (1,061.8/km2). There were 410 housing units at an average density of 924.3 per square mile (359.8/km2). The racial makeup of the village was 93.22% White, 0.17% African American, 4.88% Asian, 1.24% from other races, and 0.50% from two or more races. Hispanic or Latino of any race were 2.23% of the population.

There were 401 households, out of which 46.9% had children under the age of 18 living with them, 81.3% were married couples living together, 6.0% had a female householder with no husband present, and 11.7% were non-families. 9.7% of all households were made up of individuals, and 6.7% had someone living alone who was 65 years of age or older. The average household size was 3.02 and the average family size was 3.22.

In the village, the population was spread out, with 31.6% under the age of 18, 3.4% from 18 to 24, 23.0% from 25 to 44, 27.6% from 45 to 64, and 14.5% who were 65 years of age or older. The median age was 41 years. For every 100 females, there were 97.4 males. For every 100 females age 18 and over, there were 87.8 males.

The median income for a household in the village was $154,849, and the median income for a family was $157,402. Males had a median income of $100,000 versus $65,893 for females. The per capita income for the village was $73,628. About 2.0% of families and 2.5% of the population were below the poverty line, including 2.6% of those under age 18 and none of those age 65 or over.

Parks and recreation 
Roslyn Estates features a number of small green spaces. Those green spaces include:

 Black Ink Pond (formerly known as Lotus Pond)
 The Fenway Preserve
 The Loch Pond (also known as Little Turf Pond)

Roslyn Estates also has a number of other green spaces as well as walking paths and landscaped traffic islands with gardens.

Additionally, a private tennis club, the Tennis King, is located adjacent to Village Hall at the southern end of the village, and Christopher Morley Park forms part of the border between Roslyn Estates and North Hills.

Government

Village government 

As of May 2021, the Mayor of Roslyn Estates is Paul Leone Peters, and the Trustees are Brett Auerbach, Brian Feingold, Stephen Fox, and Susan Rubinstein.

Representation in higher government

Town representation 
Roslyn Estates is located in the Town of North Hempstead's 4th council district, which as of January 2023 is represented on the North Hempstead Town Council by Veronica Lurvey (D–Great Neck).

County representation 
Roslyn Estates is located in Nassau County's 9th Legislative district, which as of January 2023 is represented in the Nassau County Legislature by Richard Nicoello (R–New Hyde Park).

New York State representation

New York State Assembly 
Roslyn Estates is split between the New York State Assembly's Assembly district, which as of January 2023 is represented by Gina L. Sillitti (D–Manorhaven).

New York State Senate 
Roslyn Estates is located in the New York State Senate's 7th State Senate district, which as of January 2023 is represented in the New York State Senate by Jack M. Martins (R–Old Westbury).

Federal representation

United States Congress 
Roslyn Estates is located in New York's 3rd congressional district, which as of January 2023 is represented in the United States Congress by George A. Santos (R).

United States Senate 
Like the rest of New York, Roslyn Estates is represented in the United States Senate by Charles Schumer (D) and Kirsten Gillibrand (D).

Politics 
In the 2016 U.S. presidential election, the majority of Roslyn Estates voters voted for Hillary Clinton (D).

Education

School district 

The Village of Roslyn Estates is located entirely within the boundaries of (and is thus served by) the Roslyn Union Free School District. As such, all children who reside within Roslyn Estates and attend public schools go to Roslyn's schools.

The Roslyn Union Free School District's former Highland Elementary School was located in the village; the building became a synagogue after the school's closure and would later become a church.

Library district 
Roslyn Estates is located within the boundaries of Roslyn's library district, which is served by the Bryant Library. The Bryant Library is located in adjacent Roslyn.

Infrastructure

Transportation

Road 
One state-owned road travels through Roslyn Estates: Northern Boulevard (NY 25A); Northern Boulevard forms the western half of the northern boundary of Roslyn Estates, with Flower Hill. Mineola Avenue, Old Northern Boulevard, and Searingtown Road (all owned and maintained by Nassau County) form the eastern, northeastern, and most of the western boundaries of the village, respectively.

Street layout 
Roslyn Estates features a winding and organic street layout, which meanders and can be unpredictable. Many streets, such as The Hemlocks and The Birches, use a street naming convention based on nature, including plants, flowers, and trees, and begin with "The."

Rail 
No rail service passes through Roslyn Estates. The nearest Long Island Rail Road stations to the village are Roslyn on the Oyster Bay Branch and Manhasset on the Port Washington Branch.

Bus 

Roslyn Estates is served by the n20H, n21, and n23 bus routes, which are operated by Nassau Inter-County Express (NICE). These three bus routes travel through the area via Northern Boulevard and Old Northern Boulevard, along the northern border of Roslyn Estates.

Utilities

Natural gas 
National Grid USA provides natural gas to homes and businesses that are hooked up to natural gas lines in Roslyn Estates.

Power 
PSEG Long Island provides power to all homes and businesses within Roslyn Estates.

Sewage 
Roslyn Estates is partially sewered. The southern part of Roslyn Estates is within the Nassau County Sewage District, and roughly 60-70 lots were hooked up to it as of 2013. Another, smaller sewer district exists within Roslyn Estates, called The Birches Sanitary Sewer District. This district includes roughly 25 homes and flows into Nassau County's system.

The remainder of Roslyn Estates relies on cesspools and septic systems.

Water 

Roslyn Estates is located within the boundaries of the Roslyn Water District, which provides the entirety of Roslyn Estates with water.

Healthcare & emergency services

Healthcare 
There are no hospitals located within Roslyn Estates. The nearest hospital to the village is St. Francis Hospital in Flower Hill.

Fire 
The Village of Roslyn Estates is located entirely within the boundaries of (and is thus served by) the Roslyn Fire District, which consists of the Roslyn Highland Fire Department and the Hook and Ladder Company No. 1 of Roslyn.

Police 

The Village of Roslyn Estates is served by the Nassau County Police Department's 6th Precinct, with RMP 617 assigned as the patrol car for the entire village.

Notable people 
Steven B. Derounian – Former United States Congressman.
Fontaine Fox – Cartoonist and illustrator known for works such as Toonerville Folks.
I. Michael Leitman – Surgeon and Dean for Graduate Medical Education at Mount Sinai Health.
Bernard Madoff – Former NASDAQ chairman and swindler. Madoff and his family resided at 73 Dianas Trail.
Ruth Madoff – Wife of Bernard Madoff.
Mark Madoff – Son of Bernard and Ruth Madoff.
Andrew Madoff – Son of Bernard and Ruth Madoff.
Christopher Morley – Author, journalist, and poet.
David B. Pall – Chemist, inventor, and the founder of the Pall Corporation.
J. Russell Sprague – First County Executive of Nassau County.

Association of Roslyn Estates 
The Association of Roslyn Estates is the civic association for the Village of Roslyn Estates. Founded in 1911, it is the oldest civic association in the County of Nassau. Its original headquarters was at the intersection of Mineola and Warner Avenues. This building still stands, and is now used as a restaurant.

References

External links 

 Official website

Town of North Hempstead, New York
Villages in New York (state)
Villages in Nassau County, New York
Communities developed by Dean Alvord